Ansted was an American automobile manufactured from 1926 to 1927.

 Ansted-Lexington, predecessor of the Ansted manufactured in 1922
 Ansted, West Virginia
 David T. Ansted (1814–1880), English geologist and author
 Harry Bidwell Ansted

See also 
 Anstead, a surname